Kokomo Casting Plant is a Stellantis North America automotive factory in Kokomo, Indiana that manufactures aluminum parts for automotive components, transaxle cases, engine blocks, propulsion transmissions. The factory opened in 1965 and was expanded in 1969, 1986, 1995, and 1997. It is the largest die casting factory in the world. In June 2010 Chrysler announced a 300 million dollar investment to retool and modernize the Kokomo Casting for production of a future eight-speed automatic.

Current products:
 Aluminum parts
 Transmission and transaxle cases

References

External links
 

Chrysler factories
Motor vehicle assembly plants in Indiana
Companies based in Kokomo, Indiana
1965 establishments in Indiana
Buildings and structures in Howard County, Indiana
Industrial buildings completed in 1965